Battle of Nineveh may refer to:
 Battle of Nineveh (612 BC), the fall of Assyria
 Battle of Nineveh (627), the climactic battle of the Byzantine-Sassanid War of 602–628

See also 
 Western Nineveh offensive (2017), during the Iraqi Civil War